Born in 1965 in Liège, Belgium, Jean-Louis Dupont is a lawyer specialized in European law.

He was part of the legal team that led the Bosman ruling (CJEU, 15 December 1995), which forced FIFA and UEFA to end the transfer system and the nationality quota within the EU, provoking a revolution of the European sport model.

He defends various persons and entities in the world of professional sport, especially in lawsuits related to European Law which oppose clubs or sportspeople and international federations.

Among others, Jean-Louis Dupont has represented and defended the interests of the following persons and organisations:

 In 2000, South Africa, in the challenge against FIFA regarding the attribution of the World Cup 2006 to Germany, which ended with the FIFA decision to implement the continental rotation, starting with Africa in 2010.

 David Meca-Medina and Igor Majcen, in the matter which led to the Meca-Medina ruling (CJEU, 18 July 2006) which establishes the primacy of European law over all regulations and decisions of the sports federations affecting the economical activity of any person in the sports world.

 The G-14 (the association made up of 18 top European football teams), conducting, among others, the “Charleroi case” which concluded in an agreement between FIFA and UEFA, whereby clubs receive compensation when players are provided for national teams and a co-decision power with regards to the financial and sport format of the UEFA Champions League and the European League.

 Yanina Wickmayer and Xavier Malisse, as well as FC Sion, in some matters that open the debate of clubs and sportspeople having the right to turn to ordinary jurisdiction instead of having the obligation to turn exclusively to the Court of Arbitration for Sport (CAS).

 Numerous clubs and sportspeople, including Real Madrid (and some of their players including Zidane, Raul and Beckham), FC Barcelona, PSG, FC Metz, Juventus, AC Milan, FC Porto, PSV Eindhoven, Liverpool, Olympique de Marseille, Olympique Lyonnais, Galatasaray, Fenerbahce, Standard de Liège, Gica Hagi, Philippe Mexes, Oguchi Onyewu, Sergi Conceicao, Adrian Mutu, Axel Witsel, Marouane Fellaini, Alen Halilovic, José Mourinho, Michel Preud’Homme, Eric Gerets, various professional cycling teams and riders, etc.

 Daniel Striani, player agent, and supporters associations (among which PSG supporters and the "Manchester City FC supporters club") in the complaint against the "break-even rule" as enforced by the UEFA Financial Fair Play regulation.

 Legal Adviser of the Spanish Professional Football League (LPF) and the Portuguese Professional Football League (LPFP) against FIFA in the complaint against Third-Party Ownership (TPO).

 Aspire Academy (Qatar).

 Miami FC and Kingston Stockade FC (versus FIFA, CONCACAF and USSF) in the dispute regarding the implementation of the principle of promotion and relegation in the US and in Canada.

 Adrian Mutu in his recourse to the ECHR, which led this Court to decide, in its Mutu and Pechstein judgment, that CAS was to be considered as "forced arbitration" and that therefore all the fair process guarantees (article 6 ECHR) apply.

 Antonio Giraudo, ex-CEO of Juventus FC, in his recourse to the ECHR, in which Giraudo challenges the legality of the "Calciopoli" disciplinary proceedings under article 6 ECHR.

 The European Super League, a project launched in 2021 by 12 major European soccer clubs.

Jean-Louis Dupont also represents Mr. and Mrs. Bernard Tapie, for the European competition law aspects of the TAPIE-Crédit Lyonnais-Adidas dispute, which led the Commercial Court of Paris - by a judgment of 17 May 2021 - to a preliminary reference to the CJEU.

Jean-Louis Dupont is also the legal adviser of Senseball Exploitation that has developed a revolutionary soccer ball that improves football performances, called SenseBall.

Between 1990 and 1998 he also worked for the European Commission in the establishment and the development of the cooperation between the EU and Cuba.

Jean-Louis Dupont is currently working off-counsel at the law firm Roca Junyent (Barcelona-Madrid),

References 

1965 births
Living people
20th-century Belgian lawyers
21st-century Belgian lawyers
Sports law